Daisy Rockwell (born 1969) is an American Hindi and Urdu language translator and artist. She has translated a number of classic works of Hindi and Urdu literature, including Upendranath Ashk's Falling Walls, Bhisham Sahni's Tamas, and Khadija Mastur's The Women's Courtyard. Her 2021 translation of Geetanjali Shree's Tomb of Sand was the first South Asian book to win the International Booker Prize. Rockwell was awarded the 2023 Vani Foundation Distinguished Translator Award by the Vani Foundation and Teamwork Arts, during the 2023 edition of the Jaipur Literature Festival.

Personal life 
Rockwell grew up in western Massachusetts. Both her parents are artists. She is the granddaughter of the painter, illustrator, and author Norman Rockwell.

Education 
Rockwell has been a student of Hindi, Latin, French, German, and ancient Greek for many years. She received her PhD in South Asian Literature from the University of Chicago, where she studied Hindi literature, translation, and social sciences under A K Ramanujan, Susanne Hoeber Rudolph and Colin P Masica. In 1998, she received a grant to write her PhD dissertation on the Hindi author Upendranath Ashk.

Works 
Rockwell has published numerous translations from Hindi and Urdu, including her collection of translations of selected stories by Upendranath Ashk, Hats and Doctors (Penguin, 2013), Ashk's Falling Walls (Penguin, 2015), Bhisham Sahni’s Tamas (Penguin, 2016), and Khadija Mastur’s The Women’s Courtyard (Penguin, 2018). Her translation of Krishna Sobti’s final novel, A Gujarat Here, A Gujarat There (Penguin, 2019) is the first South Asian book to be awarded the Aldo and Jeanne Scaglione Prize for a Translation of a Literary Work in 2020. Her translation of Geetanjali Shree’s Tomb of Sand (Tilted Axis Press, 2021) was the first South Asian book to be shortlisted for the International Booker Prize; it went on to win the 2022 edition.

Rockwell is also a writer, painter and artist. She has published a critical biography of Upendranath Ashk (2004, Penguin), and a novel titled Taste (Foxhead Books, 2014). In 2012, she published The Little Book of Terror (Foxhead Books), a volume of paintings and essays on the Global War on Terror. She also paints under the alias Lapata, which means "missing" or "disappeared" in Urdu.

References

External links
daisyrockwell.com

1969 births
Living people
21st-century American translators
University of Chicago alumni
International Booker Prize winners
Hindi–English translators
Urdu–English translators
Norman Rockwell